Mycalesis orcha, the pale-brand bushbrown, is a satyrine butterfly found in south India. Some authors consider this as a subspecies of Mycalesis visala.

Description
The male brand is as in Mycalesis visala. But the wings are not so pointed. In underside, the ocelli are smaller and never quite developed. In the dry-season forms, the lower ocellus on the fore-wing below shows up as a very prominent white spot. The 
white discal line is much diffused outwards.

References

Mycalesis
Butterflies of Asia
Butterflies described in 1912
Endemic fauna of India